The 1965 Big Ten Conference football season was the 70th season of college football played by the member schools of the Big Ten Conference and was a part of the 1965 NCAA University Division football season.

This was the first year Big Ten teams were allowed to play 10 regular season games. Ohio State was the lone school not to play a 10th game, sticking with nine-game regular seasons through 1970.

Season overview

Results and team statistics

Key
AP final = Team's rank in the final AP Poll of the 1965 season
AP high = Team's highest rank in the AP Poll throughout the 1965 season
PPG = Average of points scored per game
PAG = Average of points allowed per game
MVP = Most valuable player as voted by players on each team as part of the voting process to determine the winner of the Chicago Tribune Silver Football trophy; trophy winner in bold

Preseason

Regular season

Bowl games

Post-season developments

Statistical leaders

The Big Ten's individual statistical leaders for the 1965 season include the following:

Passing yards

Rushing yards

Receiving yards

Total yards

Scoring

Awards and honors

All-Big Ten honors

The following players were picked by the Associated Press (AP) and/or the United Press International (UPI) as first-team players on the 1965 All-Big Ten Conference football team.

Offense

Defense

All-American honors

At the end of the 1965 season, six Big Ten players secured consensus first-team honors on the 1965 College Football All-America Team. The Big Ten's consensus All-Americans were:

Other Big Ten players who were named first-team All-Americans by at least one selector were:

Other awards
The 1965 Heisman Trophy was awarded to Mike Garrett of USC. Three Big Ten players finished among the top 10 in the voting: Illinois fullback Jim Grabowski (third); Michigan State quarterback Steve Juday (sixth); and Purdue quarterback Bob Griese (eighth).

1966 NFL Draft
The following Big Ten players were among the first 100 picks in the 1966 NFL Draft:

References